Kiyoto (written:) is a masculine Japanese given name. Notable people with the name include:

, Japanese footballer
, Japanese sprint canoeist
, Imperial Japanese Navy admiral
, Japanese-Mexican sculptor
, Japanese politician

See also
Kyoto

Japanese masculine given names